Troitsky is a rural locality (a settlement) in Zavetilyichyovsky Selsoviet, Aleysky District, Altai Krai, Russia. The population was 42 as of 2013. There are 3 streets.

Geography 
Troitsky is located 19 km northwest of Aleysk (the district's administrative centre) by road, on the Karymka River. Zavety Ilyicha is the nearest rural locality.

References 

Rural localities in Aleysky District